Francesca Iossi (born 24 May 1977) is an Italian bobsledder who has competed since 2003. Her best World Cup finish was 14th in the two-woman event at St. Moritz, Switzerland in January 2009.

References
 http://www.fibt.com/index.php?id=47&tx_bzdstaffdirectory_pi1%5BshowUid%5D=100274&tx_bzdstaffdirectory_pi1%5BbackPid%5D=93  (FIBT profile)

1977 births
Living people
Italian female bobsledders
Place of birth missing (living people)
21st-century Italian women